Franck Azzopardi (born December 5, 1970 in Châtellerault, France) is a former professional footballer. He was a defensive midfielder and played his entire career for Chamois Niortais. Since retiring from playing, he has been a coach at Niort.

External links
Franck Azzopardi profile at chamoisfc79.fr

1970 births
Living people
French footballers
Association football midfielders
Chamois Niortais F.C. players
Ligue 2 players